Hilera is a Filipino rock band formed in December 2004. Originally a three-piece band, it currently consists of Chris Padilla, Bobby Padilla, Luke Xavier Bayhon and JC Tayag.

Formation 

In February 2004, bandmates Chris Padilla and Ivan Garcia decided to form their own three-piece band. After months of searching, Padilla's brother Bobby was showing potential with his drumming skills. They decided to move forward with their lineup, and in December 2004 Hilera was officially formed.

The band joined the Nescafe Soundskool Battle of the Bands in 2005. The young band won the top spot and scored a recording contract with EMI Philippines. and release their first self titled debut album on October 30, 2006. Since then, the band has been very active and has been nominated at various award shows such as the NU Rock Awards, Myx Music Awards, IFM Pinoy Music Awards, and SOP (Pasiklaband). 

On March 11, 2009, the band released their 2nd album "Nut House" features their carrier single "Radical"

In late 2015 Ivan Garcia left the band due to personal reasons. He was later replaced by former Eraserheads and The Dawn bassist, Buddy Zabala. The band also announced that their upcoming album would be released in 2016. 

On 2018, the band released a 6 track EP titled "The Other Way Around"

Musical style 
Their style of music is a mix of punk rock, alternative rock, and rockabilly. Padilla and Garcia had a fascination with metal and other genres starting out. However, listening to bands like The Clash, Green Day and the Stray Cats defined the band's musical direction.

Discography

Studio albums

Compilations 
 Kami nAPO Muna Ulit (Universal Records, 2007)
 In Love and War (Sony Records, 2010)
 The Reunion: An Eraserheads Tribute Album (Star Records, 2012)

Band members

Chris Padilla – lead vocals, guitars (2004–present)
Bobby Padilla – drums, percussion (2004–present)
Luke Xavier Bayhon – bass guitar (2020–present)
JC Tayag – guitars, bass guitar, backing vocals  (2020–present)

Former members

Ivan Garcia – bass guitar, upright bass, backing vocals (2004–2015)
Buddy Zabala – bass guitar, backing vocals (2015–2019)
 Conrad Javier – bass guitar, backing vocals (2019–2020)

Awards and nominations

Other media

Sponsors and endorsements 
 Draven Shoes
 PRS Guitars

References

Sources 
Official website
Facebook
MYX profile
Philippine Star article
Draven profile

Filipino rock music groups
Musical groups established in 2004
Musical groups from Metro Manila